First-person view may also refer to:
 First-person view (radio control) 
 First-person (video games)
 First-person narrative
 Point-of-view shot

See also 
 First person (disambiguation)